Ray Richmond (born October 19, 1957, in Whittier, California) is a globally syndicated critic and entertainment/media columnist. Richmond has also worked variously as a feature and entertainment writer, beat reporter and TV critic for a variety of publications including the Los Angeles Daily News, Daily Variety, the Orange County Register, the late Los Angeles Herald Examiner, Deadline Hollywood, Los Angeles magazine, Buzz, The Hollywood Reporter, the Los Angeles Times, New Times Los Angeles, DGA Magazine, and Penthouse.

Deadline Hollywood
In 2011, Ray Richmond became a Deadline Hollywood contributing writer and editor.

Hollywood Reporter years
Richmond's long-running weekly column in The Hollywood Reporter was called The Pulse and was syndicated by Reuters.

In April 2006, Richmond created an online blog connected to The Hollywood Reporter. Going by the name of "Past Deadline," the blog has been on the cutting edge of breaking entertainment/celebrity related issues, such as the 2006 Mel Gibson DUI ordeal, and the Ellen Burstyn Emmy nomination controversy, stories which were subsequently picked up by the international press.

In 2009, Richmond left The Hollywood Reporter.

Other
Richmond is a graduate of California State University at Northridge. His son is radio personality Josh "Rawdog" Richmond (a.k.a. Tussin Wolf, The Illusionist, Trust Fund Baby, The Arabian Bush Baby, Rumbly Tumbly, Rumple Stumpskin, Tumble Bum, Raw Diggy, Tumbly Bumbly, Doc Banger, Sara) on The Jason Ellis Show.

During the summer of 2004, along with other outspoken colleagues, he appeared as himself in a well-received and controversial talkumentary called "Six Characters in Search of America".

Richmond has also served as a talent coordinator and segment producer for The Merv Griffin Show and had a short-lived stint as publicity VP for the cable network E!.

References

External links
 

1957 births
Living people
American reporters and correspondents
American television journalists
American bloggers
California State University, Northridge alumni
The Hollywood Reporter people
People from Whittier, California
American male journalists
Journalists from California
20th-century American journalists
21st-century American non-fiction writers
Variety (magazine) people
American male bloggers